is a Japanese manga series written by Shigemitsu Harada and illustrated by Karoti. It was serialized in Kodansha's seinen manga magazine Monthly Young Magazine from November 2017 to November 2021, with its chapters collected in seven tankōbon volumes.

Publication
Kodansha collected its chapters in seven tankōbon volumes, released from June 6, 2018, to January 20, 2022.

Volume list

See also
Cells at Work! Code Black, another manga series by the same writer
Ippatsu Kiki Musume, another manga series by the same writer
Majo wa Mioji Kara, another manga series written by the same writer
Motoyome, another manga series written by the same writer
Yuria 100 Shiki, another manga series written by the same writer

References

External links
 

Kodansha manga
Seinen manga
Sex comedy anime and manga
Sports anime and manga